The Starrett–Lehigh Building at 601 West 26th Street, between Eleventh and Twelfth Avenues and between 26th and 27th Streets in Chelsea, Manhattan, New York City, is a full-block freight terminal, warehouse and office building. It was built in 1930–31 as a joint venture of the Starrett Corporation and the Lehigh Valley Railroad on a lot where the railroad had its previous freight terminal, and was designed by the firm of Cory & Cory, with Yasuo Matsui the associate architect and the firm of Purdy & Henderson the consulting, structural engineers.

Description
The building features large setbacks, polygonal corners, and alternating bands of steel strip windows, brickwork and concrete floorplates, creating a striking effect described by architectural critic Lewis Mumford in 1931: "the contrast between the long, continuous red-brick bands and the green-framed windows, with sapphire reflections or depths, is as sound a use of color as one can see about the city." The modernity of the building's design made it one of the few American structures not designed by a major architect cited in the 1932 "Modern Architecture: International Exhibition" show of the Museum of Modern Art.

Like the Terminal Warehouse Central Stores Building on the next block uptown, trains could be driven directly into the ground floor of the building, which included not only a rail yard, but also loading and unloading facilities for trucks, warehouse areas for storage, repackaging, redistribution, and manufacturing facilities as well as areas to display goods. Three freight elevators brought up trucks driven in from the street onto higher floors for loading and unloading. The office section is above the north facade.  The structural requirements for the building, which has  of space,  of which is rentable, necessitated innovative interior engineering. During construction, the geology of the site forced a change from the original plan of a uniform 15-story building to the current layout of a 19-story section in the middle, flanked by 9-story wing on the west, and an eastern one of 18 stories.

History
The building was completed in 1931 by the Starrett Corporation and the Lehigh Valley Railroad, on the site of a former freight terminal for the latter. When William A. Starrett died in 1932, the Lehigh Valley Railroad bought the building outright, but by 1933 it was a losing proposition, with a net loss that year of $300,000. A number of factors contributed to the building not being an immediate financial success. The city's construction boom of the 1920s came to a stop with the start of the Great Depression and there was less demand for the rentable space in the building; the cost of construction was more than expected, due to changes in the foundation necessitated by differing level of bedrock across the building's footprint; and competition from another terminal with considerably cheaper rates announced to be built by the Port Authority – 111 Eighth Avenue, built in 1932 – depressed the buyer's market further, as they waited for the new building instead of renting from Starrett–Lehigh.  The Lehigh Valley Railroad disassociated itself from the building in 1944, and the rail lines were removed in 1966. By 1998, it was owned by the Helmsley real estate concern.

The Starrett–Lehigh Building was named a New York City landmark in 1986, and is part of the West Chelsea Historic District, designated in 2008.

In April 2011, Douglas W. Shorenstein's, Shorenstein Properties of San Francisco, who owned the building, sold it to Scott Rechler's, RXR Realty for $900 million. RXR began renovating the structure to serve as an upscale office building, with work on its "vertical campus" expected to be completed in 2023.

Notable tenants
Among the tenants in the building are the New York Field Office of  Homeland Security Investigations, Populous, OXO, Wheels Up Partners LLC, Diller Scofidio + Renfro, the Mcgarrybowen advertising agency, Club Monaco US of Ralph Lauren Corporation and Tommy Hilfiger USA, the building's largest tenant, Scholastic Corporation and Vanessa Deleon.

See also

 List of New York City Designated Landmarks in Manhattan from 14th to 59th Streets
 National Register of Historic Places listings in Manhattan from 14th to 59th Streets

References
Notes

Further reading

External links

New York City Designated Landmarks in Manhattan
Railroad terminals in New York City
International style architecture in New York City
Chelsea, Manhattan
Eleventh Avenue (Manhattan)
Commercial buildings completed in 1931
West Side Highway
Art Deco architecture in Manhattan